Anama limpida is a species of beetle in the family Cerambycidae, the only species in the genus Anama.

References

Elaphidiini